Hegra is a village in the municipality of Stjørdal in Trøndelag county, Norway.

Hegra may also refer to:

Hegra (Mada'in Salih), an archaeological site in the area of Al-'Ula within Al Madinah Region in the Hejaz, Saudi Arabia
Hegra (municipality), a former municipality in the old Nord-Trøndelag county, Norway
HEGRA (High-Energy-Gamma-Ray Astronomy), an atmospheric Cherenkov telescope for Gamma-ray astronomy

See also